Alexander Viktorovich Blokhin (born 12 January 1951 in Ivanovo, RSFSR, Soviet Union) is a Russian diplomat. He served as the Ambassador Extraordinary and Plenipotentiary of the Russian Federation to Australia between 2005 and 2010. On 5 May 2011 he was appointed Ambassador of Russia to Turkmenistan.

Career 
Blokhin graduated from the Ivanovo Power Institute in 1974, and for the next three years worked in various capacities at Fizpribor in Kirov. From 1977–1978, Blokhin was attached to the USSR Ministry of Defence, and from 1983–1990 was the chief engineer of the Shchelkovo Bioindustrial Complex. 

In 1990, Blokhin was elected a member of the Supreme Soviet of Russia, and served until its dissolution in 1993. Since 1992, he has worked in the Ministry of Foreign Affairs.

Alexander Blokhin's first ambassadorial appointment came in 1995, when he was appointed at ambassador of Russia to Azerbaijan, a post he held until 1999. From January 2000 he was the Minister for Federal Affairs, Nationalities and Migration in Mikhail Kasyanov's Cabinet, until October 2001 when the position was abolished.

In September 2002, he began his next ambassador post as Ambassador of Russia to Belarus, staying in Minsk until July 2005. On 10 November 2005, by decree of President Vladimir Putin, Blokhin was appointed as Ambassador of Russia to Australia. As Russia's ambassador to Australia, Alexander Blokhin was concurrently accredited as the non-resident ambassador to Fiji, Vanuatu and Nauru, in January 2006, February 2006 and March 2006, respectively.

Blokhin speaks Russian and English.

References 

Living people
1951 births
People from Ivanovo
Ambassador Extraordinary and Plenipotentiary (Russian Federation)
Ambassadors of Russia to Australia
Ambassadors of Russia to Belarus
Ambassadors of Russia to Azerbaijan
Ambassadors of Russia to Fiji
Ambassadors of Russia to Vanuatu
Ambassadors of Russia to Nauru
Ambassadors of Russia to Turkmenistan
Recipients of the Medal of the Order "For Merit to the Fatherland" I class
Recipients of the Order of Honour (Russia)